Dionys Pruckner (12 May 1834 München – 1 December 1896 Heidelberg) was a noted pianist and music teacher at Stuttgart. He was a student of Franz Liszt from 1852 until about 1855 who did concert tours throughout Europe. In 1859 he was appointed to the faculty of the Stuttgart Conservatory. Pruckner was a member of the masonic lodge Wilhelm zur aufgehenden Sonne in Stuttgart.

He is buried in Section 5 (Abteilung 5) of the  cemetery in Stuttgart, together with his wife Silly Pruckner (1837–1901). On his gravestone is a bronze relief of his head made by the sculptor  in 1893.

Sources 
 The Musical Times and Singing Class Circular, Vol. 38, No. 647. (Jan. 1, 1897), pp. 49–5.  Obituary: Dionys Pruckner at JSTOR via https://www.jstor.org/stable/3368594  (This link is to pages 49-50. The Pruckner obituary on page 50 was skipped by JSTOR and not given a stable number).

References 

1834 births
1896 deaths
19th-century pianists
19th-century German musicians
German pianists
Academic staff of the State University of Music and Performing Arts Stuttgart
Pupils of Franz Liszt